Aleksander Mycielski (born 1760) was a Polish commander of the 10th Regiment of Foot.

His most notable years were between (1786–1788).

Together with his unit he took a role in the Warsaw Uprising of 1794 during the early stages of the Kościuszko Uprising (April 17–19). Later he fought in the Battle of Biała, Battle of Nowe Miasto on 3 May, Battle of Chełm on 8 June, Battle of Kurów, Battle of Gołków on 9 July, Battle for Warsaw-Wola on 27 July and 28 August and the Battle of Maciejowice on 10 October.

He was later killed in 1818 whilst still serving in the Regiment.

References 

1818 deaths
Kościuszko insurgents
18th-century Polish–Lithuanian military personnel
19th-century Polish military personnel
Polish Army officers
Polish soldiers
Military personnel of the Polish–Lithuanian Commonwealth
1760 births